The Sommers Company is a film production company founded by Stephen Sommers and Bob Ducsay in 2004.

Filmography

References

Film production companies of the United States
Mass media companies established in 2000